Equalization, or simply EQ, in sound recording and reproduction is the process of adjusting the volume of different frequency bands within an audio signal. The circuit or equipment used to achieve this is called an equalizer. 

Most hi-fi equipment uses relatively simple filters to make bass and treble adjustments. Graphic and parametric equalizers have much more flexibility in tailoring the frequency content of an audio signal. Broadcast and recording studios use sophisticated equalizers capable of much more detailed adjustments, such as eliminating unwanted sounds or making certain instruments or voices more prominent. Since equalizers "adjust the amplitude of audio signals at particular frequencies" they are, "in other words, frequency-specific volume knobs." 

Equalizers are used in recording studios, radio studios and production control rooms, and live sound reinforcement and in instrument amplifiers, such as guitar amplifiers, to correct or adjust the response of microphones, instrument pick-ups, loudspeakers, and hall acoustics.  Equalization may also be used to eliminate or reduce unwanted sounds (e.g., low-frequency hum coming from a guitar amplifier), make certain instruments or voices more (or less) prominent, enhance particular aspects of an instrument's tone, or combat feedback (howling) in a public address system. Equalizers are also used in music production to adjust the timbre of individual instruments and voices by adjusting their frequency content and to fit individual instruments within the overall frequency spectrum of the mix.

Terminology

The concept of equalization was first applied in correcting the frequency response of telephone lines using passive networks; this was prior to the invention of electronic amplification. Initially, equalization was used to "compensate for" (i.e., correct) the uneven frequency response of an electric system by applying a filter having the opposite response, thus restoring the fidelity of the transmission. A plot of the system's net frequency response would be a flat line, as its response at any frequency would be equal to its response at any other frequency. Hence the term "equalization."

Much later the concept was applied in audio engineering to adjust the frequency response in recording, reproduction, and live sound reinforcement systems. Sound engineers correct the frequency response of a sound system so that the frequency balance of the music as heard through speakers better matches the original performance picked up by a microphone. Audio amplifiers have long had filters or controls to modify their frequency response. These are most often in the form of variable bass and treble controls (shelving filters), and switches to apply low-cut or high-cut filters for elimination of low frequency "rumble" and high frequency "hiss" respectively.

Graphic equalizers and other equipment developed for improving fidelity have since been used by recording engineers to modify frequency responses for aesthetic reasons. Hence in the field of audio electronics the term "equalization" is now broadly used to describe the application of such filters regardless of intent. This broad definition therefore includes all linear filters at the disposal of a listener or engineer.

A British EQ or British style equalizer is one with similar properties to those on consoles made in the UK by companies such as Amek, Neve and Soundcraft from the 1950s through to the 1970s. Later on, as other manufacturers started to market their products, these British companies began touting their equalizers as being a cut above the rest.  Today, many non-British companies such as Behringer and Mackie advertise British EQ on their equipment. A British style EQ seeks to replicate the qualities of the expensive British mixing consoles.

History
Filtering audio frequencies dates back at least to acoustic telegraphy and multiplexing in general. Audio electronic equipment evolved to incorporate filtering elements as consoles in radio stations began to be used for recording as much as broadcast. Early filters included basic bass and treble controls featuring fixed frequency centers, and fixed levels of cut or boost. These filters worked over broad frequency ranges. Variable equalization in audio reproduction was first used by John Volkman working at RCA in the 1920s. That system was used to equalize a motion picture theater sound playback system.

The Langevin Model EQ-251A was the first equalizer to use slide controls. It featured two passive equalization sections, a bass shelving filter, and a pass band filter. Each filter had switchable frequencies and used a 15-position slide switch to adjust cut or boost. The first true graphic equalizer was the type 7080 developed by Art Davis's Cinema Engineering. It featured 6 bands with a boost or cut range of 8 dB. It used a slide switch to adjust each band in 1 dB steps. Davis's second graphic equalizer was the Altec Lansing Model 9062A EQ. In 1967 Davis developed the first 1/3 octave variable notch filter set, the Altec-Lansing "Acousta-Voice" system.

In 1966, Burgess Macneal and George Massenburg began work on a new recording console. Macneal and Massenburg, who was still a teenager, conceptualized an idea for a sweep-tunable EQ that would avoid inductors and switches. Soon after, Bob Meushaw, a friend of Massenburg, built a three-band, frequency adjustable, fixed-Q equalizer. When asked who invented the parametric equalizer, Massenburg stated “four people could possibly lay claim to the modern concept: Bob Meushaw, Burgess Macneal, Daniel Flickinger, and myself… Our (Bob’s, Burgess’ and my) sweep-tunable EQ was borne, more or less, out of an idea that Burgess and I had around 1966 or 1967 for an EQ… three controls adjusting, independently, the parameters for each of three bands for a recording console… I wrote and delivered the AES paper on Parametrics at the Los Angeles show in 1972… It’s the first mention of `Parametric’ associated with sweep-tunable EQ.”

Daniel N. Flickinger introduced the first parametric equalizer in early 1971. His design leveraged the high performance op-amp of his own design, the 535 series (USPTO #3727896) to achieve filtering circuits that were before impossible. Flickinger's patent (USPTO #3752928) from early in 1971 showed the circuit topology that would come to dominate audio equalization until the present day, as well as the theoretical underpinnings of the elegant circuit. Instead of slide potentiometers working on individual bands of frequency, or rotary switches, Flickinger's circuit allowed completely arbitrary selection of frequency and cut/boost level in three overlapping bands over the entire audio spectrum. Six knobs on his early EQ's would control these sweepable filters. Up to six switches were incorporated to select shelving on the high and low bands, and bypassing for any unused band for the purest signal path. His original model boasts specifications that are seldom met today.

Other similar designs appeared soon thereafter from George Massenburg (in 1972) and Burgess McNeal from ITI corp. In May 1972 Massenburg introduced the term parametric equalization in a paper presented at the 42nd convention of the Audio Engineering Society. Most channel equalization on mixing consoles made from 1971 to the present day rely upon the designs of Flickinger, Massenburg and McNeal in either semi or fully parametric topology. In the late 1990s and in the 2000s, parametric equalizers became increasingly available as digital signal processing (DSP) equipment, usually in the form of plug-ins for various digital audio workstations. Standalone outboard gear versions of DSP parametric equalizers were also quickly introduced after the software versions and are typically called Digital Parametric Equalizers.

Filter types

Although the range of equalization functions is governed by the theory of linear filters, the adjustment of those functions and the flexibility with which they can be adjusted varies according to the topology of the circuitry and controls presented to the user. Shelving controls are usually simple first-order filter functions which alter the relative gains between frequencies much higher and much lower than the cutoff frequencies. A low shelf, such as the bass control on most hi-fi equipment, is adjusted to affect the gain of lower frequencies while having no effect well above its cutoff frequency. A high shelf, such as a treble control, adjusts the gain of higher frequencies only. These are broad adjustments designed more to increase the listener's satisfaction than to provide actual equalization in the strict sense of the term.

A parametric equalizer, on the other hand, has one or more sections each of which implements a second-order filter function. This involves three adjustments: selection of the center frequency (in Hz), adjustment of the Q which determines the sharpness of the bandwidth, and the level or gain control which determines how much those frequencies are boosted or cut relative to frequencies much above or below the center frequency selected. In a semi-parametric equalizer there is no control for the bandwidth (it is preset by the designer) or is only selected between two presets using a switch. In a quasi-parametric equalizer, the bandwidth is depending on the gain level. With rising gain, the bandwidth gets wider.

A graphic equalizer also implements second-order filter functions in a more user-friendly manner, but with somewhat less flexibility. This equipment is based on a bank of filters covering the audio spectrum in up to 31 frequency bands. Each second-order filter has a fixed center frequency and Q, but an adjustable level. The user can raise or lower each slider in order to visually approximate a "graph" of the intended frequency response.

Since "equalization" in the context of audio reproduction is not used strictly to compensate for the deficiency of equipment and transmission channels, the use of high-pass and low-pass filters may be mentioned. A high-pass filter modifies a signal by eliminating only lower frequencies. An example of this is a low-cut or rumble filter, which is used to remove infrasonic energy from a program that may consume undue amplifier power and cause excessive diaphragm excursions in (or even damage to) loudspeakers. A low-pass filter only modifies the audio signal by removing high frequencies. An example of this is a high-cut or hiss filter, which is used to remove annoying white noise at the expense of the crispness of the program material.

A first-order low-pass or high-pass filter has a standard response curve that reduces the unwanted frequencies well above or below the cutoff frequency with a slope of 6 dB per octave. A second-order filter will reduce those frequencies with a slope of 12 dB per octave and moreover may be designed with a higher Q or finite zeros in order to effect an even steeper response around the cutoff frequency. For instance, a second-order low-pass notch filter section only reduces (rather than eliminates) very high frequencies, but has a steep response falling to zero at a specific frequency (the so-called notch frequency). Such a filter might be ideal, for instance, in completely removing the 19 kHz FM stereo subcarrier pilot signal while helping to cut even higher frequency subcarrier components remaining from the stereo demultiplexer.

In addition to adjusting the relative amplitude of frequency bands, an audio equalizer usually alters the relative phases of those frequencies. While the human ear is not as sensitive to the phase of audio frequencies (involving delays of less than 1/30 second), music professionals may favor certain equalizers because of how they affect the timbre of the musical content by way of audible phase artifacts.

High-pass and low-pass filters
A high-pass filter is a filter, an electronic circuit or device, that passes higher frequencies well but attenuates (cuts or decreases) lower-frequency components. A low-pass filter passes low-frequency components of signals while attenuating higher frequencies. Some audiophiles use a low-pass filter in the signal chain before their subwoofer speaker enclosure, to ensure that only deep bass frequencies reach the subwoofer. In audio applications these high-pass and low-pass filters are frequently termed "low cut" and "high cut", respectively, to emphasize their effect on the original signal. For instance, sometimes audio equipment will include a switch labeled "high cut" or described as a "hiss filter" (hiss being high-frequency noise). In the phonograph era, many stereos would include a switch to introduce a high-pass (low cut) filter, often called a "rumble filter", to eliminate infrasonic frequencies.

Shelving filter
While high-pass and low-pass filters are useful for removing unwanted signal above or below a set frequency, shelving filters can be used to reduce or increase signals above or below a set frequency. Shelving filters are used as common tone controls (bass and treble) found in consumer audio equipment such as home stereos, and on guitar amplifiers and bass amplifiers. These implement a first-order response and provide an adjustable boost or cut to frequencies above or below a certain point.

A high shelf or "treble control" will have a frequency response |H(f)| whose square is given by:
 
where fp and fz are called the pole and zero frequencies, respectively. Turning down the treble control increases fz and decreases fp so that frequences higher than fp are attenuated. Turning up the treble control increases fp and decreases fz so that frequencies higher than fz are boosted. Setting the treble control at the center sets  fz = fp so that |H(f)|2 = 1 and the circuit has no effect. At most, the slope of the filter response in the transition region will be 6 dB per octave (thus a doubling of signal voltage and a consequent quadrupling of signal power for every doubling of frequency).

Similarly the response of a low shelf (or "low shelving or "bass control") can be represented as
 
In this case, the inclusion of the leading factor simply indicates that the response at frequencies much higher than fz or fp is unity and that only bass frequencies are affected.

A high shelving control in which fz is set to infinity, or a low shelving response in which fz is set to zero, implements a first-order low-pass or high-pass filter, respectively. However, the usual tone controls have a more limited range, since their purpose is not to eliminate any frequencies but only to achieve a greater balance when, for instance, the treble is lacking and the sound is not crisp. Since the range of possible responses from shelving filters is so limited, some audio engineers considered shelving controls inadequate for equalization tasks.

On some bass amps and DI boxes, the units provide both low and high shelving controls and additional equalization controls.

Graphic equalizer

In the graphic equalizer, the input signal is sent to a bank of filters. Each filter passes the portion of the signal present in its own frequency range or band. The amplitude passed by each filter is adjusted using a slide control to boost or cut frequency components passed by that filter. The vertical position of each slider thus indicates the gain applied to that frequency band, so that the knobs resemble a graph of the equalizer's response plotted versus frequency.

The number of frequency channels (and therefore each one's bandwidth) affects the cost of production and may be matched to the requirements of the intended application. A car audio equalizer might have one set of controls applying the same gain to both stereo channels for convenience, with a total of five to ten frequency bands. On the other hand, an equalizer for professional live sound reinforcement typically has some 25 to 31 bands, for more precise control of feedback problems and equalization of room modes. Such an equalizer (as shown above) is called a 1/3-octave equalizer (spoken informally as "third-octave EQ") because the center frequencies of its filters are spaced one third of an octave apart, three filters to an octave. Equalizers with half as many filters per octave are common where less precise control is required—this design is called a 2/3-octave equalizer.

Parametric equalizer

Parametric equalizers are multi-band variable equalizers that allow users to control the three primary parameters: amplitude, center frequency and bandwidth. The amplitude of each band can be controlled, and the center frequency can be shifted, and the bandwidth (which is inversely related to "Q") can be widened or narrowed. Parametric equalizers are capable of making much more precise adjustments to the sound than other equalizers, and are commonly used in sound recording and live sound reinforcement. Parametric equalizers are also sold as standalone outboard gear units.

A variant of the parametric equalizer is the semi-parametric equalizer, which is also known as a sweepable filter. It allows users to control the amplitude and frequency, but uses a pre-set bandwidth of the center frequency. In some cases, semi-parametric equalizers allow the user to select between a wide and a narrow preset bandwidth.

Filter functions

The responses of linear filters are mathematically described in terms of their transfer function or, in layman's terms, frequency response. A transfer function can be decomposed as a combination of first-order responses and second-order responses (implemented as so-called biquad sections). These can be described according to their so-called pole and zero frequencies, which are complex numbers in the case of second-order responses.

First-order filters

A first-order filter can alter the response of frequencies above and below a point. In the transition region the filter response will have a slope of up to 6 dB per octave. The bass and treble controls in a hi-fi system are each a first-order filter in which the balance of frequencies above and below a point are varied using a single knob. A special case of first-order filters is a first-order high-pass or low-pass filter in which the 6 dB per octave cut of low or high frequencies extends indefinitely. These are the simplest of all filters to implement individually, requiring only a capacitor and resistor.

Second-order filters

Second-order filters are capable of resonance (or anti-resonance) around a particular frequency. The response of a second-order filter is specified not only by its frequency but also its Q; a higher Q corresponds to a sharper response (smaller bandwidth) around a particular center frequency. For instance, the red response in the accompanying image cuts frequencies around 100 Hz with a higher Q than the blue response which boosts frequencies around 1000 Hz. Higher Q's correspond to resonant behaviour in which the half-power or −3 dB bandwidth, BW, is given by:

where F0 is the resonant frequency of the second-order filter. BW is the bandwidth expressed in the same frequency unit that F0 is. Low Q filter responses (where Q < ) are not said to be resonant and the above formula for bandwidth does not apply.

It is also possible to define the Q of a band-pass function as:

where N is the bandwidth in octaves.  The reverse mapping is:

A second-order filter response with Q of less than 1/2 can be decomposed into two first-order filter functions, a low-cut and a high-cut (or boost). Of more interest are resonant filter functions which can boost (or cut) a narrow range of frequencies. In addition to specifying the center frequency F0 and the Q, the specification of the filter's zeros determines how much that frequency band will be boosted (or cut). Thus a parametric equalizer section will have three controls for its center frequency F0, bandwidth or Q, and the amount of boost or cut usually expressed in dB.

The range of second-order filter functions is important because any analog filter function can be decomposed into a (usually small) number of these (plus, perhaps, simpler first-order responses). These are implemented directly by each section of a parametric equalizer where they are explicitly adjusted. And each element of a graphic equalizer based on a filter bank includes one such element whose Q is not adjustable by the user.

Uses 
In sound recording, equalization may be used to adjust frequency responses for practical or aesthetic reasons, where the end result typically is unequal volume levels for the different frequencies. For example, equalization is used to modify an instrument's sound or make certain instruments and sounds more prominent. A recording engineer may use an equalizer to make some high-pitches in a vocal part louder while making low-pitches in a drum part quieter.

Equalization is commonly used to increase the depth of a mix, creating the impression that some sounds in a mono or stereo mix are farther away or closer than others. Selected components of parts that would otherwise compete, such as bass guitar and kick drum, are boosted in one part and cut in the other, and vice versa, so that they both stand out.

Equalizers can correct problems posed by a room's acoustics, as an auditorium will generally have an uneven frequency response especially due to standing waves and acoustic dampening. For instance, the frequency response of a room may be analyzed using a spectrum analyzer and a pink noise generator. Then a graphic equalizer can be easily adjusted to compensate for the room's acoustics. Such compensation can also be applied to tweak the sound quality of a recording studio in addition to its use in live sound reinforcement systems and even home hi-fi systems.

During live events where signals from microphones are amplified and sent to speaker systems, equalization is not only used to "flatten" the frequency response but may also be useful in eliminating feedback. When the sound produced by the speakers is picked up by a microphone, it is further reamplified; this recirculation of sound can lead to "howling", requiring the sound technician to reduce the gain for that microphone, perhaps sacrificing the contribution of a singer's voice, for instance. Even at a slightly reduced gain, the feedback will still cause an unpleasant resonant sound around the frequency at which it would howl. But because the feedback is troublesome at a particular frequency, it is possible to cut the gain only around that frequency while preserving the gain at most other frequencies. This can best be done using a parametric equalizer tuned to that very frequency with its amplitude control sharply reduced. By adjusting the equalizer for a narrow bandwidth (high Q), most other frequency components will not be affected. The extreme case when the signal at the filter's center frequency is completely eliminated is known as a notch filter.

An equalizer can be used to correct or modify the frequency response of a loudspeaker system rather than designing the speaker itself to have the desired response. For instance, the Bose 901 speaker system does not use separate larger and smaller drivers to cover the bass and treble frequencies. Instead it uses nine drivers all of the same four-inch diameter, more akin to what one would find in a table radio. However, this speaker system is sold with an active equalizer. That equalizer must be inserted into the amplifier system so that the amplified signal that is finally sent to the speakers has its response increased at the frequencies where the response of these drivers falls off, and vice versa, producing the response intended by the manufacturer.

Tone controls (usually designated "bass" and "treble") are simple shelving filters included in most hi-fi equipment for gross adjustment of the frequency balance. The bass control may be used, for instance, to increase the drum and bass parts at a dance party, or to reduce annoying bass sounds when listening to a person speaking. The treble control might be used to give the percussion a sharper or more "brilliant" sound, or can be used to cut such high frequencies when they have been overemphasized in the program material or simply to accommodate a listener's preference.

A "rumble filter" is a high-pass (low cut) filter with a cutoff typically in the 20 to 40 Hz range; this is the low frequency end of human hearing. "Rumble" is a type of low-frequency noise produced in record players and turntables, particularly older or low quality models. The rumble filter prevents this noise from being amplified and sent to the loudspeakers. Some cassette decks have a switchable "subsonic filter" feature that does the same thing for recordings.

A crossover network is a system of filters designed to direct electrical energy separately to the woofer and tweeter of a 2-way speaker system (and also to the mid-range speaker of a 3-way system). This is most often built into the speaker enclosure and hidden from the user. However, in bi-amplification, these filters operate on the low level audio signals, sending the low-frequency and high-frequency signal components to separate amplifiers, which connect to the woofers and tweeters, respectively.

Equalization is used in a reciprocal manner in certain communication channels and recording technologies. The original music is passed through a particular filter to alter its frequency balance, followed by the channel or recording process. At the end of the channel or when the recording is played, a complementary filter is inserted which precisely compensates for the original filter and recovers the original waveform. For instance, FM broadcasting uses a pre-emphasis filter to boost the high frequencies before transmission, and every receiver includes a matching de-emphasis filter to restore it. The white noise that is introduced by the radio is then also de-emphasized at the higher frequencies (where it is most noticeable) along with the pre-emphasized program, making the noise less audible. Tape recorders used the same approach to reduce "tape hiss" while maintaining fidelity. On the other hand, in the production of vinyl records, a filter is used to reduce the amplitude of low frequencies which otherwise produce large amplitudes on the tracks of a record. Then the groove can take up less physical space, fitting more music on the record. The preamplifier attached to the phono cartridge has a complementary filter boosting those low frequencies, following the standard RIAA equalization curve.

See also 
 Electronic filter
 Loudness compensation
 Weighting filter

Citations

General sources 

 Glen Ballou, "Filters and equalizers", Handbook for Sound Engineers, Fourth edition, Focal Press, 2008 .

External links

 Playback equalization for 78rpm shellacs and early LPs (EQ curves, index of record labels): Audacity Wiki
 Discriminating EQ frequencies by ear
 Calculator: bandwidth per octave  to quality factor  and back
 EQ Condensed Overview
 Audio EQ Cookbook
 PreSonus Equalizer Terms and Tips
 WikiRecording's Guide to Equalization

Audio effects
Effects units
Linear filters
Sound recording
Tone, EQ and filter